Bruce McMaster-Smith (19 November 1939 – 6 June 2017) was a former Australian rules footballer who played with Fitzroy, Carlton and St Kilda in the Victorian Football League (VFL) during the early 1960s.

Originally from Diamond Valley Football League club Greensborough, McMaster-Smith played as a rover and wingman. He started out at Fitzroy but played his best football with Carlton and was their equal top vote getter in the 1962 Brownlow Medal.

McMaster-Smith, now at St Kilda, kicked a last-second goal to give his new club a win over his old team Carlton and was on the wing when the Saints lost the 1965 VFL Grand Final to Essendon later in the year. He had almost made a Grand Final with Fitzroy in 1960 but they lost the Preliminary Final to Collingwood by five points and he was also at Carlton when they reached the 1962 Grand Final but he missed the entire finals series. After the 1965 premiership decider, he was forced to retire due to chronic hamstring problems.

He played football as an amateur so he could compete in amateur athletics competitions.

References
Notes

Sources

Holmesby, Russell and Main, Jim (2007). The Encyclopedia of AFL Footballers. 7th ed. Melbourne: Bas Publishing.

1939 births
2017 deaths
Fitzroy Football Club players
Carlton Football Club players
St Kilda Football Club players
Greensborough Football Club players
Australian rules footballers from Victoria (Australia)